
Gmina Świlcza is a rural gmina (administrative district) in Rzeszów County, Subcarpathian Voivodeship, in south-eastern Poland.

Villages
Gmina Świlcza contains the villages and settlements of Błędowa Zgłobieńska, Bratkowice, Bzianka, Dąbrowa, Mrowla, Rudna Wielka, Świlcza, Trzciana and Woliczka.

Neighbouring gminas
Gmina Świlcza is bordered by the city of Rzeszów and by the gminas of Boguchwała, Głogów Małopolski, Iwierzyce, Kolbuszowa and Sędziszów Małopolski.

References
Polish official population figures 2006

Swilcza
Rzeszów County